Dannevirke Danish Lutheran Church and Community Hall is a historic church at Dannervirke Road and Wausa in Elba, Nebraska. The church was founded by Danish Americans and the congregation maintained strong ties to their Danish heritage and language.

It was built in 1901 and was added to the National Register in 1999.

References

Danish-American culture in Nebraska
Lutheran churches in Nebraska
Churches on the National Register of Historic Places in Nebraska
Carpenter Gothic church buildings in Nebraska
Neoclassical architecture in Nebraska
Churches completed in 1901
National Register of Historic Places in Howard County, Nebraska
1901 establishments in Nebraska
Neoclassical church buildings in the United States